A Matter of Size (Sipur Gadol, lit: "A Big Story") is a 2009 Israeli film.

Plot 
Herzl Mesika is an obese man who struggles unsuccessfully to lose weight.  When he starts a new job in a Japanese restaurant he is introduced to the sport of Sumo wrestling.  Herzl decides to use his weight to his advantage by founding Israel's first Sumo wrestling team.

Cast 
 Itzik Cohen - Herzl
 Dvir Benedek - Aharon
 Alon Dahan - Gidi
 Shmulik Cohen - Sami
 Irit Kaplan - Zehava
 Togo Igawa - Kitano
 Levana Finkelstein - Mona Mesika
 Evelin Hagoel - Geula

External links
 

2009 films
Israeli comedy films
Sumo films
Films about obesity